Ghassan bin Jiddo, (born 8 August 1962) is a veteran Tunisian-Lebanese journalist, activist and the director of Beirut-based pan-Arab satellite television channel, Al Mayadeen. He has been recognized in the popular press as an influential Arab personality.

Early life and education
Ghassan bin Jiddo was born to a Muslim Tunisian father and a Christian Lebanese mother in Al Koussour, Tunisia, on 8 August 1962. He studied in Tunisia and was a student activist during his education years.

Career
Jiddo began his journalism career as a correspondent for the BBC Network, Al Hayat and other Arab newspapers as well as the Arab Institute for International Studies in Washington. Later, he began to serve as the bureau chief of Al Jazeera in Iran. Then, he became the bureau chief of Al Jazeera in Beirut. However, in April 2011, he resigned from Al Jazeera due to its lack of professionalism and objectivity in covering the Arab Spring. It was claimed that he did not endorse the station’s full coverage of the situation in Libya, Yemen, and Syria, while completely ignoring the crisis in Bahrain.

In 2012, Jiddo became the director of Beirut-based pan-Arab satellite television station, Al Mayadeen, launched on 11 June 2012.

Notable works
During his Al Jazeera years, Jiddo worked on a documentary about Hezbollah. He had an exclusive interview with the secretary general of Hezbollah, Hassan Nasrallah, during the Israel-Lebanon conflict of 2006. In the same year, he also interviewed Julia Boutros, Walid Jumblat and former Cuban president Fidel Castro. He was regarded as the most watched and most popular presenter on Al Jazeera in 2007. He became an influential figure on the Al Jazeera network in 2010, with his program Hiwar Maftuh ("Open dialogue" in Arabic) that was one of the most commonly watched programs. He made insightful interviews with decision makers in his talk-show, and he received much acclaim for Al Jazeerah's coverage of the war in Lebanon in 2006.

Views
After his resignation from Al Jazeera, Jiddo claimed that the opposition in Syria and those who support them are responsible for the spilled Syrian blood, asserting that real opposition should never use weapons and violence against the citizens. Jiddo also appreciated Bashar Al Assad's ongoing reforms which disappointed those who wanted to interfere in Syria's internal affairs. In June 2012, he argued that "the regime of Bashar Al Assad is being subject to an international conspiracy".

Personal life
Jiddo is married to an Iranian woman, Neda Ghaemmaghami. Originally a Tunisian citizen, Ghassan has dual citizenship after acquiring the Lebanese nationality.

He was chosen to be the 24th most influential Arab among 100 Arab personalities by Arabian Business in 2007 and 59th most influential Arab in the world among 500 Arab personalities again by Arabian Business in 2011. He was mentioned as a possible successor to then Al Jazeera director general Wadah Khanfar.

References

External links

1962 births
Al Jazeera people
Lebanese activists
Lebanese journalists
Lebanese Muslims
Lebanese people of Tunisian descent
Lebanese television presenters
Living people
Tunisian journalists
Tunisian people of Lebanese descent